The 2019 Arena Football League season was the 32nd and final season in the history of the Arena Football League (AFL) before filing for bankruptcy. Prior to the start of the season, the league expanded from four to six teams with two added expansion teams. The 12-game regular season began on April 26 and ended on July 21.

League business

Teams
For the first time since 2011, the AFL entered the season with more teams than it had the previous season, adding an expansion team and reactivating another that had been dormant for over a decade.

The league announced the Atlantic City Blackjacks expansion team on January 22, 2019, that is operated by the same ownership group as the Albany Empire. On February 7, 2019, the league re-added the Columbus Destroyers as another expansion team to bring the league back to six teams.

Schedule and playoff changes

The 2019 season consisted of a 13-week schedule during which each team played 12 games and had one bye week.

At the end of the regular season, the top four teams participated in the ArenaBowl playoffs, in which the top seed faced the fourth seed while the second seed faced the third seed in a home-and-home series.  The team in each series with the highest aggregate score advanced to the ArenaBowl. If the aggregate score in either series was tied after the second game in the home-and-home semifinals, the game would have continued in the AFL's standard overtime format.  While the semifinals consisted of two games in each pairing, ArenaBowl XXXII was still one game.

Closure
The AFL announced it had closed its teams' local operations on October 29, following that with a Chapter 7 bankruptcy liquidation filing November 27.

Final season standings

 - clinched regular season title - clinched playoff berth

Playoffs

Semifinals 

All times listed are in EDT.

ArenaBowl XXXII

Attendance
Announced attendance figures for each home game. In the weekly columns, dashes (—) indicate away games or a bye week, while bold font indicates the highest attendance of each team.

Awards

All–Arena teams

First team

Second team

References